The Baddies are a villainous professional wrestling stable currently performing in All Elite Wrestling (AEW) consisting of leader Jade Cargill  and Leila Grey. Cargill is the current and inaugural TBS Champion in her first reign.

History 
Jade Cargill formed The Baddies in April 2022, then consisting of Kiera Hogan and Red Velvet, and Mark Sterling serving as the groups lawyer. On May 29, at Double or Nothing, Stokely Hathaway became their publicist and, a few weeks later, in late-June, Leila Grey became part of the stable, replacing an injured Velvet. The group would accompany Jade Cargill to the ring during her reign as TBS Champion. In October 2022, the group began a public feud with rapper. Bow Wow. On November 23, Red Velvet returned, and Cargill ordered Mark Sterling to fire Kiera Hogan. On the December 30 edition of Rampage after Jade Cargill had retained her title against former Baddie Kiera Hogan, Red Velvet walked up the ramp while Cargill and Grey celebrated in the ring.

Championships and accomplishments
All Elite Wrestling
AEW TBS Championship (1 time, current) - Cargill

References

All Elite Wrestling teams and stables
Women's wrestling teams and stables